Michael Kirk is a small family firm of butchers in Wolverhampton, England, established in 1934, which has won several prizes for their pies, including National Pork Pie Champion, 2005, and for their sausages.

Owner Michael Bachyk says of his pork pies:

See also
 List of butcher shops

References

External links

1934 establishments in England
Butcher shops
Companies based in Wolverhampton
Retail companies established in 1934
Shops in England